Bayhead Natural Heritage Site is a 20ha nature reserve of mangrove forest and coastal grassland within the industrial area of Durban Bay, South Africa.   The reserve is a remnant of what was once the largest mangrove swamp in the province.

A number of birds can be found in the reserve, up to 120 different aquatic birds have been recorded.  As in the nearby Beachwood Mangrove Nature Reserve, various crabs can also be found.  There is a boardwalk and public information centre on site.

In March 2015, a vegetable oil spill from a refinery in the area caused a number of mangrove trees to die.

References 

Nature reserves in South Africa